Much Ado About Nixi is a 1942 German comedy film directed by Erich Engel and starring Jenny Jugo, Albert Matterstock and Hans Leibelt. It was shot at the Cinecittà studios in Rome. A separate Italian-language version was also produced.

Cast
Jenny Jugo as Nixi Barkas
Albert Matterstock as Roland von Gabriel
Hans Leibelt as Barkas, General manager
Heinz Salfner as Augustus
Otto Gebühr as village school teacher
Fritz Hoopts as Captain
Hans Adalbert Schlettow as Gendarm
André Mattoni as Mäcki Fiori
Maria Krahn
Toni von Bukovics
Ernst Rotmund
Karl Hannemann
Karl-Heinz Peters
Klaus Pohl
Maria von Schmedes as singer
Theodor Danegger as vegetable trader

References

External links

1942 comedy films
1940s multilingual films
1940s German-language films
German comedy films
Films of Nazi Germany
Films directed by Erich Engel
Films shot in Rome
German multilingual films
Films shot at Cinecittà Studios
German black-and-white films
1940s German films